Maksim Lotysh (born 5 June 2002) is a Belarusian professional footballer who plays for Slonim-2017.

Honours
Dinamo Brest
Belarusian Super Cup winner: 2019

References

External links 
 
 

2001 births
Living people
Belarusian footballers
Association football midfielders
FC Minsk players
FC Dynamo Brest players
FC Slonim-2017 players